Terril Calder is a Canadian artist and animator. She is most noted for her short film Snip, which was named to the Toronto International Film Festival's annual year-end Canada's Top Ten list in 2016.

Calder, a Métis from Fort Frances, Ontario, released her first short film Canned Meat in 2009. In 2011 she was the animator on Michelle Latimer's short film Choke, which was a Genie Award nominee for Best Animated Short Film at the 32nd Genie Awards in 2012, and on her own short film The Gift, which won the Kent Monkman Award for Best Experimental/Innovation in Storytelling at the 2011 imagineNATIVE Film and Media Arts Festival.

In 2014 she released The Lodge, her first full-length feature film.

Her most recent short film, Meneath: The Hidden Island of Ethics, was released in 2021.

References

External links

Canadian animated film directors
Canadian women film directors
Film directors from Ontario
People from Fort Frances
Métis filmmakers
Living people
Year of birth missing (living people)